Pipariya is a town in Hoshangabad district Indian state of Madhya Pradesh. It is known for the railhead for the military station and tourist destination of Pachmarhi. Pipariya railway station is on the Itarsi-Jabalpur rail line and is under the Jabalpur railway division.

Demographics
The Pipariya city is divided into 21 wards for which elections are held every five years. As of the 2011 census of India, the Pipariya Municipality has a population of 48,826 of which 25,294 are males and 23,532 are females. 

There were 5,666 children aged 0–6 is 5666 (11.60% of the population). The female sex ratio was 930 against the state average of 931: for children it was around 900 compared to the state average of 918. the literacy rate of Pipariya was 86.16%, higher than the state average of 69.32%. Male literacy was 91.61% and female literacy rate 80.34%.

Pipariya Municipality had over 10,225 houses to which it supplies basic amenities like water and sewerage. It is also authorised to build roads within the municipality limits and to impose taxes on properties coming under its jurisdiction.

Schedule castes constituted 15.95% of the population and Schedule Tribes 3.27%.

15,707 people were engaged in work or a business activity. Of this, 12,809 were males and 2,898 females. In the census, a worker is defined as a person who does business, has a job, provides a service, is a cultivator or does labour activity. 88.65% of workers were engaged in main work and 11.35% in marginal work.

References

Cities and towns in Hoshangabad district
Hoshangabad